Hornsrud's Cabinet governed Norway between 28 January 1928 and 15 February 1928. The first Labour Party cabinet in Norway, it was defeated by the other parliamentary parties on a vote of no confidence after only sixteen days.

In its day it was often known as Arbeiderregjeringen, "the workers' cabinet".

It had the following composition:

Cabinet members

|}

Secretary to the Council of State
This position is now known as Secretary to the Government (Regjeringsråd).

Nicolai Franciscus Leganger

References
Christopher Hornsrud's Government. 28 January 1928 - 15 February 1928 – Government.no

Notes

Hornsrud
Hornsrud
1928 establishments in Norway
1928 disestablishments in Norway
Cabinets established in 1928
Cabinets disestablished in 1928